Carl Edwin Bulfin (born 19 August 1973) is a former New Zealand cricketer who played in four One Day Internationals in 1999.

Bulfin was selected for the New Zealand cricket team after several explosive performances in the domestic one day and Cricket Max competition. Known for his steam-rolling fast medium deliveries and striking blonde dreadlocks, Bulfin was a revelation and a novelty on the cricket field during the mid/late 1990s and injected some much needed fast bowling excitement into an arena that was saturated with many mediocre medium pacers.

He was born in Blenheim and has now retired from the game after injuries forced him away from the sport in 2000. He now works as a house painter and mentors young bowlers in the Blenheim area.

International career
Although Bulfin was selected for New Zealand to play against South Africa and then again in the 1999 World Cup pool games, injuries prevented him excelling on the international stage.

References

1973 births
Living people
New Zealand cricketers
Central Districts cricketers
Wellington cricketers
New Zealand One Day International cricketers
Cricketers from Blenheim, New Zealand
House painters
Cricketers at the 1999 Cricket World Cup
South Island cricketers
North Island cricketers